Taco Hajo van den Honert (born 14 February 1966 in Leiden) is a former field hockey player from the Netherlands, who represented his native country in three consecutive Summer Olympics (1988, 1992 and 1996).

At his last appearance in Atlanta, Georgia, the skilled striker won the golden medal with the Dutch national team. A drag flick specialist playing for Amsterdam for most of his career, he retired from international field hockey after that event. He earned a total number of 215 caps, scoring 118 goals.

References
  Dutch Olympic Committee

External links
 

1966 births
Living people
Dutch male field hockey players
Dutch field hockey coaches
Olympic field hockey players of the Netherlands
Field hockey players at the 1988 Summer Olympics
Field hockey players at the 1992 Summer Olympics
Field hockey players at the 1996 Summer Olympics
Sportspeople from Leiden
Olympic gold medalists for the Netherlands
Olympic bronze medalists for the Netherlands
Olympic medalists in field hockey
Medalists at the 1988 Summer Olympics
Medalists at the 1996 Summer Olympics
Amsterdamsche Hockey & Bandy Club players
1990 Men's Hockey World Cup players
20th-century Dutch people
21st-century Dutch people